Padgal is a village located in Nizamabad district in Telangana, India. 

It was formerly within the state of Andhra Pradesh.

Demographics

According to the 2011 Census of India, Padgal had a total population of 5,688 people; of whom 2,811	were male and 2,877 were female. 

2,510 of the population were recorded as literate.

References

Villages in Nizamabad district